The Royal Tenenbaums is a 2001 American comedy-drama film directed by Wes Anderson and co-written with Owen Wilson. It stars Danny Glover, Gene Hackman, Anjelica Huston, Bill Murray, Gwyneth Paltrow, Ben Stiller, Luke Wilson, and Owen Wilson. Ostensibly based on a nonexistent novel, and told with a narrative influenced by the writing of J. D. Salinger, it follows the lives of three gifted siblings who experience great success in youth, and even greater disappointment and failure in adulthood. The children's eccentric father, Royal Tenenbaum (Hackman), leaves them in their adolescent years and returns to them after they have grown, falsely claiming he has a terminal illness. He works on reconciling with his children and ex-wife (Huston).

With a variety of influences, including Louis Malle's 1963 film The Fire Within and Orson Welles' 1942 film The Magnificent Ambersons, the story involves themes of the dysfunctional family, lost greatness, and redemption. An absurdist and ironic sense of humor pervades the film, which features a soundtrack subsequently released in two albums. The Royal Tenenbaums was shot in and around New York City, including a house in Harlem used for the Tenenbaum residence. The filmmakers went to efforts to distinguish the film's backgrounds from a recognizable New York, with fashions and sets combining the appearances of different time periods.

After debuting at the New York Film Festival, The Royal Tenenbaums received positive reviews from critics and was Anderson's most financially successful film until 2014's The Grand Budapest Hotel. Hackman won a Golden Globe for his performance, and the screenwriters were nominated for the Academy Award for Best Original Screenplay. In 2016, it was included in BBC's 100 Greatest Films of the 21st Century.

Plot 
Royal Tenenbaum explains to his three adolescent children, Chas, Margot, and Richie, that he and his wife, Etheline, are separating. Each of the children achieved great success at a young age. Chas is a math and business genius, from whom Royal steals money. Margot, who was adopted, was awarded a grant for a play that she wrote in the ninth grade. Richie is a tennis prodigy and artist who expresses his love for Margot through paintings. Royal regularly takes Richie on outings without the other children. Eli Cash is the Tenenbaums' neighbor and Richie's best friend. Also part of the Tenenbaum household is Pagoda, the trusted valet.

Twenty-two years later, Royal is kicked out of the hotel where he has been living. The children are in a post-success slump, with Richie traveling the world on a cruise ship, following a breakdown. He writes to Eli revealing his romantic love for Margot. Chas has become overprotective of his sons, Ari and Uzi, following his wife Rachael's death in a plane crash. Margot is married to neurologist Raleigh St. Clair, from whom she hides her smoking and her checkered past. Raleigh is conducting research on a subject named Dudley Heinsbergen.

Etheline's longtime accountant, Henry Sherman, proposes to her. Learning of Henry's proposal, Royal claims that he has stomach cancer to win back his wife's and children's affections. Etheline calls her children home, and Royal moves back in and sets up medical equipment in Richie's room. Royal learns of Chas' overprotective nature and takes his grandsons on an adventure involving shoplifting and dog fighting. On their return, Chas berates him for endangering his boys while Royal accuses Chas of having a nervous breakdown.

Eli, with whom Margot has been having an affair, tells her that Richie loves her. Royal discovers the affair and objects to Margot's treatment of Raleigh, who confides to Richie his suspicions of Margot having an affair. He and Richie hire a private investigator to surveil her. Meanwhile, Henry investigates Royal's cancer claim and discovers his hospital had closed, his doctor does not exist, and that his cancer medication is only candy. He confronts Pagoda, the servant, and gathers the family to tell them that Royal has been lying about his illness. Afterwards, Royal and Pagoda move out.

Richie and Raleigh get the private eye's report on Margot, which reveals her history of smoking and sexual promiscuity, including a previous marriage to a Jamaican recording artist. Both men take the news hard, with Richie going into a bathroom, shaving off his hair and beard, and slashing his wrists in an attempt of suicide. Dudley finds him and Raleigh rushes him to hospital. As the Tenenbaums sit in the waiting room, Raleigh confronts Margot and then leaves. Richie escapes and meets with Margot to confess his love. They share their secret love and they kiss.

Royal decides that he wants Etheline to be happy, and finally arranges for a divorce. Before Henry and Etheline's wedding, Eli, high on mescaline, crashes his car into the side of the house. Royal rescues Ari and Uzi, but the boys' dog, Buckley, is killed. Enraged, Chas chases Eli through the house and wrestles him to the ground. Eli and Chas agree that they both need psychiatric help. Chas thanks Royal for saving his sons and for buying them a Dalmatian named Spark Plug from the responding firemen as a replacement for Buckley. Forty-eight hours later, Etheline and Henry are married in a judge's chambers.

Some time later, Margot releases a new play inspired by her family and past events, Raleigh publishes a book about Dudley's condition, Eli checks himself into a drug rehabilitation facility in North Dakota, and Richie begins teaching a junior tennis program. Chas becomes less overprotective of his children. Royal seems to have improved his relationship with all his children, and seems to be on better terms with Etheline. He has a heart attack and dies at the age of 68. Chas accompanies him in the ambulance on the way to the hospital, and is the only witness to his death. The family attends his funeral, where the epitaph reads that he "Died tragically rescuing his family from the wreckage of a destroyed sinking battleship."

Cast 

The Royal Tenenbaums has an ensemble cast, led by Hackman. Alec Baldwin also serves as the narrator. The fictional family and performers are:

Production

Development 
A starting point for the story's concept was the divorce of director Wes Anderson's mother and father, though the evolved story bears little resemblance to it. French director Louis Malle's works, such as his 1971 Murmur of the Heart, were an influence on Anderson, with The Royal Tenenbaums particularly drawing from The Fire Within (1963), where a suicidal man tries to meet his friends. A line from The Fire Within is translated into English and appears as "I'm going to kill myself tomorrow." Orson Welles' 1942 film The Magnificent Ambersons was also an influence, with Anderson acknowledging he may have subconsciously selected the main set for its reflection of Welles' production. E. L. Konigsburg's book From the Mixed-Up Files of Mrs. Basil E. Frankweiler, where the characters Claudia and Jamie run away to live in the Metropolitan Museum of Art in New York, inspired the story of Margot and Richie hiding out in a museum. Having read the book, Anderson said it long stuck with him.

J. D. Salinger's characters in the 1961 book Franny and Zooey inspired much of the child prodigy material. The children of the Glass family in Salinger's work are precocious with an abundance of exceptional talents. Franny and Zooey also features characters wearing distinctive fashions and a character with the name Tannenbaum. "Tenenbaum" is the name of a family of Anderson's acquaintance.

The film Les Enfants Terribles (1950) by Jean-Pierre Melville partly inspired Richie and Margot's relationship. Other inspirations were one of Anderson's childhood friends who loved his sister, and Anderson's interest in the incest taboo; he acknowledged the relationship became more believable when the story was revised to make Margot adopted. In inventing the characters, Owen Wilson and Anderson also used neurologist Oliver Sacks as a model for Raleigh, while the notion of Eli writing Old Custer was based on Cormac McCarthy's style of storytelling. Wilson and Anderson completed the screenplay in two years, needing the extended time because of its complexity.

Casting 
Gene Hackman was Anderson's choice for Royal, with Anderson saying, "It was written for him against his wishes". Etheline Tenenbaum was written with Anjelica Huston in mind. Hackman was hesitant about accepting the role, citing his lack of understanding of, or commonalities with Royal. Hackman's agent persuaded him to take the role, though his reluctance led to Michael Caine being considered for the part. Gene Wilder was also rumored to be a possible choice.

Hackman's decision to star made it easier to assemble a cast of high-profile actors to appear with him. However, Ben Stiller and Gwyneth Paltrow were available only for a limited time, requiring the shooting schedule to work around them. Following a nadir in his career with Larger Than Life and The Man Who Knew Too Little in the 1990s, Bill Murray had opted to focus on supporting parts in offbeat comedies, starting with Anderson's Rushmore and then The Royal Tenenbaums. Anderson discovered Stephen Lea Sheppard, who played Dudley, through his friend Judd Apatow, as he was acting in Apatow's television series, Freaks and Geeks.

Alec Baldwin was approached by Anderson to narrate the film, though Anderson reportedly told him at first that he actually didn't want the film to be narrated and wasn't going to use his voiceover for the finished film, as the producers were insisting him to have one. When Baldwin shared this story during the Tribeca Film Festival in 2021 while celebrating the film's 20th anniversary, Anderson replied that he never said that. Despite Baldwin's claims, The Wes Anderson Collection author Matt Zoller Seitz pointed out in his book that the narration was always present on the screenplay.

Filming 
Around 250 sets were employed during photography, with art director Carl Sprague saying the crew avoided sites that would identify New York City, even altering street signs. The house used in the film is located near the famous Sugar Hill in the Hamilton Heights section of Harlem in Manhattan at 339 Convent Avenue. For the "quintessential New York story", Anderson went location scouting in May 2000, spotted the house and admired what he described as its "storybook quality". The owner, Willie Woods, was planning to remodel it, but agreed to delay the project for six months for principal photography. Anderson said the dalmatian mice that populate the house had their spots applied using a Sharpie.

The Waldorf-Astoria was used for the hotel scenes, while Central Park Zoo depicted a rain forest. A United States Navy training ship represented Richie's ship. The crew also added 10,000 square feet of AstroTurf at Forest Hills Stadium, to depict Richie's tennis match.

During production, Anderson gave Huston photographs of his mother who, like Etheline, was an archaeologist. Huston said, "Wes would send pictures of his mother in aviator jackets or on archaeological digs, and he very specifically wanted me to wear a certain locket. Finally, I asked him, 'Wes, am I playing your mother?'" Anderson replied this was not the case.

Anderson and Huston had a tense relationship with Hackman, who was not always amiable on set. On the first day Hackman and Huston appeared in a scene together, Huston had to slap him, and later said the slap was real and "I hit him a really good one. I saw the imprint of my hand on his cheek and I thought, he's going to kill me." During young Margot's birthday scene in the opening scenes, Huston's hair caught fire from a birthday candle. Anderson credited Kumar Pallana with extinguishing the blaze before Huston was seriously injured.

As shooting continued, the bird used for Mordecai was caught by a citizen of New Jersey, who demanded a price for its return. It was replaced instead by one more white in color.

Themes 
Journalist Jesse Fox Mayshark wrote that, like the similarly titled The Magnificent Ambersons, Anderson's story follows an older mother considering remarriage, creating a stir in the family. Professor Claire Perkins added that in The Royal Tenenbaums, this tension regarding a possible remarriage has minor class and racial elements, with Chas refusing to call Henry by his first name and Royal calling Henry an "old black buck". Royal also calls Henry "Coltrane" and speaks jive, drawing on racial stereotypes found in media. To The Magnificent Ambersons family-drama template, Mayshark wrote that Anderson added his "naturally redemptive instincts", stressing "forgiveness" over villainizing the guilty. Royal's "redemption" is a central theme. Professor Carl Plantinga assessed Royal's motives as shifting from "purely selfish" considerations to genuine hopes for reconciliation when he is removed from the home after his false illness is exposed. Perkins observed that before Royal's death, he had endeared himself to each Tenenbaum in some way. To do this, he had to force his way back into the family's lives as an intruder professing an intent to "make up for lost time". The prospect of Royal and Etheline rekindling their marriage is largely regarded as impossible, though she weeps at Royal's false terminal illness, and Royal inquires about her "love life". In the end, the "ritual community celebration signalling successful social integration" that is a staple of comedy endings comes in the form of Etheline's marriage to Henry rather than a remarriage to Royal, Plantinga wrote.

Academic Donna Kornhaber theorized that through adultery and pronouncements that "There are no teams", Royal had separated himself from the Tenenbaums; Royal's belief that he is not a Tenenbaum is signaled when he seconds Eli's sentiment that he "always wanted to be a Tenenbaum". However, Kornhaber added that Royal may also view his family members as "external expressions of himself", and this explains why the title refers to them as Royal Tenenbaums.

Author Mark Browning also identified the dysfunctional family and family happiness as a key theme. Mayshark commented on the depiction of decline after genius, with all the characters being past the peak of their greatness and now being left "sad, individually and collectively". Browning assessed the Tenenbaum sons and daughter as child prodigies, with "clear-cut genius status". Ethel is not negligent as a mother, fostering her children's talents, though in dispensing money without question she may have spoiled them.

The children grow up hailed as a "family of geniuses", and when they face failure in adulthood, they turn to nostalgia, with academic Daniel Cross Turner remarking that the word "nostalgia" literally means returning home in pain. The fact that the Tenenbaums dress alike as children and adults also reveals their nostalgia, and Turner connected Royal's nostalgia with Dudley's fictional Heinsbergen syndrome symptom, an inability to "tell time". Professor Whitney Crothers Dilley considered that confrontation between past reputation and the private reality is what moves Margot not to take the word "genius" lightly, and to deny she was ever a genius, despite Royal insisting people called her one. Although the film ends without any of the characters regaining their lost glory, they form new bonds, particularly between Royal and Chas, or realize secret desires, in the case of Richie and Margot.

Film Professor Christopher Robe commented on the loss of loved ones, particularly Royal's parents and Chas' wife Rachael, having an impact on the characters' depression. Royal's mother Helen O'Reilly Tenenbaum is rarely named, but her role in shaping Royal and guiding his behavior is profound, with Robe arguing this is signified by a shot of Royal under a painting of Helen in a World War II Red Cross outfit. Royal's father is never named, but Royal also misses him; Robe further hypothesized that Chas alienating his sons after Rachael's death shows that family history is repeating itself.

Style 

The storytelling has been described as "absurdist", ironic, and "whimsical". Mayshark wrote that literature shapes the narrative, which is presented as a book with chapters, a prologue and an epilogue. To the chapter-format of the story, Plantinga added that Baldwin's narration gives "exposition" that "should arouse courtesy" in the viewers for the characters. Commenting on the literary framework, Browning detailed how the first scene has the camera looking down on the book being checked out at the library, followed by the tone of J. D. Salinger's study of "disillusionment". Archaic dialogue with the feel of literature ("You've made a cuckold of me") is combined with crass, casual dialogue ("We can swing by her grave, too"). Film scholar Kim Wilkins also characterized lines such as "I'm very sorry for your loss. Your mother was a terribly attractive woman" as "deadpan", "Andersonian", and "unexpected expressions". Ethel also reveals her fondness for Royal's "little expressions", such as "true blue".

Mayshark added the style is "imaginatively visual", with detailed sets and an ambiguous time setting, featuring fashions from the 1960s to the present. Critic Amy Wallace placed it in Anderson's cinematic universe, where "the colors are brighter, the bookshelves are meticulously ordered, the bunk beds aren't just made – they look like you could bounce a silver dollar off them". Professor Dilley identified the setting with the New York City of the 1970s, matching the backdrop style to depictions of the city in the films The French Connection and Midnight Cowboy; this feel is heightened by music popular in the 1970s, by The Rolling Stones and Paul Simon. Dilley argued this depiction of a lost New York is connected to "literary history". Plantinga commented an "illustrative, intentionally artificial tableaux" begins immediately with Baldwin's narration.

Wes Anderson's brother Eric Chase Anderson sketched proposed appearances for the characters before shooting. The character Richie is presented as a tennis star with headbands and armbands, and sunglasses that virtually hide his face, until his "ritualistic" shaving scene reveals him. The appearance of Margot, played by Paltrow, was modeled after singer Nico. Chas, played by Stiller, appears in a red tracksuit, matching him with Ari and Uzi and suggesting "running away from sadness". The young performers playing Royal and Ethel's sons and daughter wear the same costumes as their adult counterparts, evoking "arrested development".

With the cinematography, Wes Anderson enjoyed keeping the camera mobile, providing new perspectives in a single take with no actual cut. Analyst Thomas Caldwell judged the cinematography as unusual, comprising "steady symmetrical medium shots" that help the viewer see the characters' emotional anguish more clearly, particularly in their eyes. Author Gustavo Mercado considered the medium shots a tool to give character and surroundings comparable levels of attention, and to communicate the character's eccentricities and activities. Mercado assessed the scene with Margot smoking in the bathroom to display "carefully chosen lighting, depth of field, wardrobe, body language, and ... composition". The opening credits use "medium close-up" shots with each character looking towards the direction of the camera, contributing to the literary narrative as a "Cast of Characters".

The paintings in Eli's apartment are by Mexican artist Miguel Calderón. Font designer Mark Simonson noted Anderson makes extensive use of typography, in particular Futura and its variation Futura Bold. For characters who are not biologically Tenenbaums, such as Raleigh, other typefaces are used, such as Helvetica on the covers of the character's books.

Soundtrack 

Anderson declared The Royal Tenenbaums to be "the most complex, ambitious musical piece I've ever worked on". The soundtrack features rock songs from the 1960s through the 1990s. There have been two soundtrack album releases for the film, though not all of the songs used in the film appear on the albums. Songs used include: Paul Simon's "Me and Julio Down by the Schoolyard", Van Morrison's "Everyone", John Lennon's "Look at Me", Nick Drake's "Fly", the Mutato Muzika Orchestra version of the Beatles' "Hey Jude", "These Days" by Nico, and two songs by the Rolling Stones. Erik Satie's "Gymnopédie No. 1" is also used in the film, as is the iconic song of A Charlie Brown Christmas (1965) by Vince Guaraldi. According to the marketing of the film, particular musical instruments are matched with each character, with the association established in the introductory narration and continuing to the conclusion.

In 2002, the soundtrack was re-released containing the score, composed by Mark Mothersbaugh, along with more of the songs. The Rolling Stones' songs "She Smiled Sweetly" and "Ruby Tuesday" were omitted for lack of rights.

Release 
The film premiered at the New York Film Festival on October 5, 2001, which had previously screened Anderson's Rushmore in 1998. Distributed by Touchstone Pictures, it opened in New York City and Los Angeles in December 2001. In February 2002, it was screened at the Berlin International Film Festival.

To mark a decade since its debut, Anderson and his stars returned to the New York Film Festival for a screening of The Royal Tenenbaums in fall 2011. After previously publishing a DVD edition, The Criterion Collection released a Blu-ray in Region A in 2012.

Reception

Box office 
On its opening weekend, The Royal Tenenbaums made $276,891 in five theaters, or around $55,396 at each venue. By February 2002, it doubled Rushmores total gross at the U.S. box office.

The film finished its run on June 20, 2002, with a gross of $52,364,010 in North America. It made $19,077,240 in other territories, for a worldwide total of $71,441,250. With the final $70 million gross, it remained Anderson's most financially successful film when it returned to the New York Film Festival in 2011. The Grand Budapest Hotel surpassed it in 2014.

Critical response 
On Rotten Tomatoes, the film holds an approval rating of 80% based on 210 reviews, and an average rating of 7.51/10. The site's critics consensus reads: "The Royal Tenenbaums is a delightful adult comedy with many quirks and a sense of poignancy. Many critics especially praised Hackman's performance.” On Metacritic, the film has a weighted average score of 76 out of 100, based on 34 critics, indicating "generally favorable reviews". Audiences polled by CinemaScore gave the film an average grade of "C−" on an A+ to F scale.

At its premiere at the New York Film Festival, A.O. Scott wrote in The New York Times that it eventually won him over as charming, and that Hackman brought "quick precision and deep seriousness [that] nearly rescue[d] this movie from its own whimsy". Varietys Todd McCarthy described the film, "As richly conceived as the novel it pretends to be."
Richard Schickel of Time wrote, "As with Anderson's Rushmore, there's a certain annoying preciousness to this film—it's not so consistently wise or amusing as he thinks it is—but it has its moments". Roger Ebert awarded it three-and-a-half stars, admiring how viewers can be ambivalent toward the events in the story. The San Francisco Chronicles Mick LaSalle was enthusiastic, praising the film as "like no other, an epic, depressive comedy, with lots of ironic laughs and a humane and rather sad feeling at its core". Anthony Lane commented in The New Yorker on the setting, which did not truly feel like New York, but "a step-city, or a city-in-law", and said that "the communal oddity" gradually won him over. The New York Posts Lou Lumenick hailed it as "the year's best movie" and "possibly the most quintessential New York film since Manhattan". Peter Travers found all the cast great in different ways, while singling out Hackman. L.A. Weeklys Manohla Dargis wrote it had enough laughs to be classified as a comedy, but it contained "a deep vein of melancholia to its drollery". The Guardians Joe Queenan embraced it as a "bizarre redemption tale".

Some critics disagreed about the success of the film and its style. New Yorks Peter Rainer wrote, "Anderson is something of a prodigy himself, and he's riddled with talent, but he hasn't figured out how to be askew and heartfelt at the same time." In the Los Angeles Times, Kenneth Turan assessed the film as indulging too far in Anderson's vision, creating an unknown world. In his 2015 Movie Guide, Leonard Maltin gave it two-and-a-half stars out of four, complimenting the eccentricity, but finding no storyline.

Time listed Royal Tenenbaums in its Top 10 Troubled Genius Films list in 2009, comparing Anderson's characters to Salinger's, in an "ultimately touching package". In 2013, Time also named Henry Sherman as one of 10 memorable accountant characters in film history, citing his decency, success as an author and lack of confidence in his pursuit of Etheline. In 2014, The Huffington Post journalist Lisa Thomson evaluated it as one of Anderson's best films, and that finding laughs in divorce was a highlight. In 2017, Vanity Fair cited Richie's tennis meltdown scene as one of the best tennis scenes in cinema history, making an analogy to Björn Borg.

In 2008, a poll taken by Empire ranked The Royal Tenenbaums as the 159th greatest film ever made. A 2016 poll of international critics assembling BBC's 100 Greatest Films of the 21st Century also voted it one of the 100 greatest motion pictures since 2000. Hackman has received kudos for his performance. In 2015, IndieWire named Royal as Anderson's most memorable character, crediting Hackman for bringing the character beyond the director's norm; the same list also named Margot "the ur-Anderson female" character.

Accolades 
The film received a nomination at the 74th Academy Awards for Best Original Screenplay. CNN reported that it had been considered as a possibility for nominations for Best Cinematography, Best Art Direction and Best Actor for Hackman. Hackman did win the Golden Globe for Best Actor in a Musical or Comedy, but was unable to accept the award in person.

Legacy 

The narration and the way the film follows each family member was reprised in Fox's critically acclaimed television sitcom Arrested Development. Jason Bateman, one of the show's stars, describes the show as "The Royal Tenenbaums shot like COPS". Arrested Development creator and head writer Mitchell Hurwitz said that when he saw The Royal Tenenbaums, he already had the idea for Arrested Development in mind and thought, "Well, that's it, I can't do that anymore", but subsequently changed his mind.

Alec Baldwin, the narrator, has effusively praised the film, including it in his Top 10 Criterion Collection and calling it "arguably one of the most original movies, in tone and style, since Robert Altman's M*A*S*H". He also modeled his performance of the character Jack Donaghy on the television series 30 Rock after Hackman's speech and movements as Royal Tenenbaum.

The Tenenbaums' style has been cited as an influence in fashion design, and Margot Tenenbaum has been described by Vogue as the "muse of the season" for Spring/Summer 2015 collections.

References

Bibliography

External links 

 
 
 
 

2001 films
2001 comedy-drama films
Adultery in films
American comedy-drama films
Films about dysfunctional families
Films directed by Wes Anderson
Films featuring a Best Musical or Comedy Actor Golden Globe winning performance
Films produced by Barry Mendel
Films produced by Scott Rudin
Films produced by Wes Anderson
Films scored by Mark Mothersbaugh
Films set in New York City
Films shot in New York City
Films with screenplays by Wes Anderson
Films with screenplays by Owen Wilson
Media containing Gymnopedies
Films about self-harm
Touchstone Pictures films
2000s English-language films
2000s American films